Clarke County is a county located in the U.S. state of Iowa. As of the 2020 census, the population was 9,748. The county seat is Osceola. The county was formed in January 1846, one of twelve counties established by legislative action in a comprehensive act. It was named for James Clarke, a Governor of the Iowa Territory.

History
The first courthouse for Clarke County was a wood frame two–story structure in Osceola. In 1883 it was replaced with a brick structure on former park area in the town square. By the 1950s this building was insufficient, and the present modern structure was completed in 1956. It was added to the National Register of Historic Places in 2018.

Geography

Adjacent counties
Decatur County  (south)
Lucas County  (east)
Madison County  (northwest)
Union County  (west)
Warren County  (northeast)

Highways
 Interstate 35 - runs north–south through central Clarke County, passing Osceola
 U.S. Highway 34 - runs east–west through central Clarke County, passing Osceola
 U.S. Highway 69 - enters northeastern Clarke County, runs southwest to Osceola, then south to south line of county

Transit
 Osceola station
 List of intercity bus stops in Iowa

Communities

Cities

Murray
Osceola
Weldon
Woodburn

Unincorporated communities

Hopeville
Jamison
Lacelle
Liberty
Ottawa
Smyrna

Townships

 Doyle
 Franklin
 Fremont
 Green Bay
 Jackson
 Knox
 Liberty
 Madison
 Osceola
 Troy
 Ward
 Washington

Demographics

2020 census
There were 4,268 housing units of which 3,871 were occupied.

2010 census
There were 4,086 housing units, of which 3,701 were occupied.

2000 census

As of the census of 2000, there were 9,133 people, 3,584 households, and 2,498 families residing in the county. The population density was 21 people per square mile (8/km2). There were 3,934 housing units at an average density of 9 per square mile (4/km2). The racial makeup of the county was 96.64% White, 0.11% Black or African American, 0.33% Native American, 0.35% Asian, 0.03% Pacific Islander, 1.96% from other races, and 0.58% from two or more races. 4.04% of the population were Hispanic or Latino of any race.

There were 3,584 households, out of which 32.10% had children under the age of 18 living with them, 57.80% were married couples living together, 8.30% had a female householder with no husband present, and 30.30% were non-families. 25.90% of all households were made up of individuals, and 13.30% had someone living alone who was 65 years of age or older. The average household size was 2.50 and the average family size was 3.01.

In the county, the population was spread out, with 26.30% under the age of 18, 7.60% from 18 to 24, 26.50% from 25 to 44, 22.50% from 45 to 64, and 17.10% who were 65 years of age or older. The median age was 39 years. For every 100 females there were 97.00 males. For every 100 females age 18 and over, there were 94.00 males.

The median income for a household in the county was $34,474, and the median income for a family was $42,171. Males had a median income of $29,648 versus $20,522 for females. The per capita income for the county was $16,409. About 6.20% of families and 8.50% of the population were below the poverty line, including 12.10% of those under age 18 and 7.70% of those age 65 or over.

Population ranking
The population ranking of the following table is based on the 2020 census of Clarke County.

† county seat

Politics
Prior to 1988, Clarke County was a Republican-leaning swing county, only failing to back the national winner four times between 1896 & 1984. The county was reliably Democratic from 1988 to 2012, but made a 29.5 point swing to back Donald Trump in 2016.

See also

National Register of Historic Places listings in Clarke County, Iowa
Clarke County website

References

 
1846 establishments in Iowa Territory
Populated places established in 1846